John Norman (2 August 1909 – 23 March 1994) was an Australian rules footballer who played with Fitzroy in the Victorian Football League (VFL).

Family
The eldest son of Norwegian-born Jonas Mattias Elija Svehaug (1886–1968) and Sarah Ann Curran (1886–1968), John Svehaug was born in Newport, Wales (the city of his mother's birth) on 2 August 1909. The family took the anglicised surname Norman when they emigrated to Australia in 1914.

He married Stella May Sullivan in 1931.

Football
After a single senior game in three years with Fitzroy, Norman transferred to Preston during the 1939 season where he played either side of his period of service in the Royal Australian Air Force during World War II.

Notes

External links 

		
Jack Norman's playing statistics from The VFA Project

1909 births
1994 deaths
VFL/AFL players born outside Australia
Australian rules footballers from Victoria (Australia)
Fitzroy Football Club players
Preston Football Club (VFA) players
Royal Australian Air Force personnel of World War II